Hellinsia powelli is a moth of the family Pterophoridae that is endemic to Costa Rica.

The forewings are dark brown. Adults are on wing in June.

References

powelli
Moths described in 1996
Endemic fauna of Costa Rica
Moths of Central America